Chemosis is the swelling (or edema) of the conjunctiva. The term derives from the Greek words cheme and -osis, cheme meaning cockleshell due to the swollen conjunctiva resembling it, and -osis meaning condition. The swelling is due to the oozing of exudate from abnormally permeable capillaries. In general, chemosis is a nonspecific sign of eye irritation. The outer surface covering appears to have fluid in it. The conjunctiva becomes swollen and gelatinous in appearance. Often, the eye area swells so much that the eyes become difficult or impossible to close fully. Sometimes, it may also appear as if the eyeball has moved slightly backwards from the white part of the eye due to the fluid filled in the conjunctiva all over the eyes except the iris. The iris is not covered by this fluid and so it appears to be moved slightly inwards.

Causes 

It is usually caused by allergies or viral infections, often inciting excessive eye rubbing. Chemosis is also included in the Chandler Classification system of orbital infections.

If chemosis has occurred due to excessive rubbing of the eye, the first aid to be given is a cold water wash for eyes.

Other causes of chemosis include:
Superior vena cava obstruction, accompanied by facial oedema
Hyperthyroidism, associated with exophthalmos, periorbital puffiness, lid retraction, and lid lag
Cavernous sinus thrombosis, associated with infection of the paranasal sinuses, proptosis, periorbital oedema, retinal haemorrhages, papilledema, extraocular movement abnormalities, and trigeminal nerve sensory loss
Carotid-cavernous fistula - classic triad of chemosis, pulsatile proptosis, and ocular bruit
Cluster headache
Trichinellosis
Systemic lupus erythematosus (SLE)
Angioedema
Acute glaucoma
Panophthalmitis
Orbital cellulitis
Gonorrheal conjunctivitis
Dacryocystitis
Spitting cobra venom to the eye
High concentrations of phenacyl chloride in chemical mace spray
Urticaria
Trauma
HSV Keratitis 
Post surgical
Mucor
Rhabdomyosarcoma of the orbit

Diagnosis

An eye doctor may most often diagnose chemosis by doing a physical examination of the affected area. They can also ask questions about the severity and length of other symptoms.

Treatment 
Treatment depends on the cause of the chemosis.

References

External links 

Eye diseases
Inflammations
Disorders of conjunctiva